Hupa (native name: Na꞉tinixwe Mixine꞉wheʼ, lit. "language of the Hoopa Valley people") is an Athabaskan language (of Na-Dené stock) spoken along the lower course of the Trinity River in Northwestern California by the Hoopa Valley Hupa (Na꞉tinixwe) and Tsnungwe/South Fork Hupa (Tse:ningxwe) and, before European contact, by the Chilula and Whilkut peoples, to the west.

Speakers
The 2000 US Census estimated the language to be spoken by 64 persons between the ages of 5 and 17, including 4 monolingual speakers. As of 2012, there were fewer than 10 individuals whose Hupa could be called fluent, at least one of whom (Verdena Parker) was a fully fluent bilingual. Perhaps another 50 individuals of all ages have restricted control of traditional Hupa phonology, grammar and lexicon. Beyond this, many tribal members share a small vocabulary of words and phrases of Hupa origin.

Phonology 
The consonants of Hupa in the standard orthography are listed below (with IPA notation in slashes):

Notes about the consonant system and how it is written:
 The palatal stops g, k, and kʼ are written  gy, ky, and kyʼ before the letters  a, o, and u.
 The velar stops G, K, and Kʼ have a limited distribution; G and K are only found in diminutive words.
 The sound chwʼ occurs mainly as a variant pronunciation of chw in some words.
 The sound  sh is rare and occurs mainly in exclamations or loanwords.

Vowels may be lengthened.

Orthography 
The Hupa alphabet is as follows:

Morphology

Verb themes and classes
As with other Dene languages, the Hupa verb is based around a theme. Melissa Axelrod has defined a theme as "the underlying skeleton of the verb to which prefixes or strings of prefixes or suffixal elements are added in producing an utterance. The theme itself has a meaning and is the basic unit of the Athabaskan verbal lexicon."   In addition to a verb stem, a typical theme consists of a classifier, one or more conjunct prefixes, and one or more disjunct prefixes.

According to Victor Golla (1970, 2001 and others), each Hupa theme falls into one of eight structural classes according to its potential for inflection, along the following three parameters: active vs. neuter, transitive vs. intransitive, and personal vs. impersonal. Golla (2001: 817)

1. Active themes are inflected for aspect-mode categories, while neuter themes are not.
2. Transitive themes are inflected for direct object, while intransitive themes are not.
3. Personal themes are inflected for subject, while impersonal themes are not.

Golla (2001: 818) presents examples of themes from each of the eight structural classes. Orthography has been changed to conform to the current accepted tribal orthography:

Active themes: 
Transitive 
Personal	O-ƚ-me꞉n            'fill O'
Impersonal	no꞉=O-d-(n)-ƚ-tan  'O gets used to something'Intransitive 
Personal	tsʼi-(w)-la꞉n/lan  'play (at a rough sport)' 
Impersonal	(s)-daw             'melt away disappear'

Neuter themes: Transitive 
Personal	O-si-ƚ-ʼa꞉n         'have (a round object) lying'
Impersonal	O-wi-l-chwe꞉n       'O has been made, created'Intransitive''' 
Personal	di-n-chʼa꞉t         'ache, be sick'
Impersonal     	kʼi-qots           'there is a crackling sound'

Verb template
As with other Dene languages, the Hupa verb is composed of a verb stem and a set of prefixes. The prefixes can be divided into a conjunct prefix set and disjunct prefix set. The disjunct prefixes occur on the outer left edge of the verb. The conjunct prefixes occur after the disjunct prefixes, closer to the verb stem. The two types of prefixes can be distinguished by their different phonological behavior. The prefix complex may be subdivided into 10 positions, modeled in the Athabaskanist literature as a template, as follows:

adapted from Campbell, Amy. (2007). Hupa Ditransitives and the Syntactic Status of R.  Conference on Ditransitive Constructions. MPI-EVA, Leipzig.

Pronouns, pronominal inflection
Hupa verbs have pronominal (i.e., pronoun) prefixes that mark both subjects and objects. The prefixes can vary in certain modes, particularly the perfective mode (See e.g., Mode and Aspect for a discussion of modes in Navajo, a related Dene language). The prefixes vary according to person and number. The basic subject prefixes are listed in the table below:

{| class="IPA wikitable" frame=void style="vertical-align:top; text-align:center; white-space:nowrap;"
! rowspan="2" | Person/Number !! colspan="2" | Subject Prefixes !! colspan="2" | Object Prefixes
|-
! Singular !! Plural !! Singular !! Plural
|-
! First (1)
| -wh- || -di- || -wh- || rowspan="2" | -noh-
|-
! Second (2)
| ni- || -oh- || ni-
|-
! Third animate (3)
| colspan="2" | -chʼi- || colspan="2" | xo-
|-
! Third obviative (3)
| colspan="2" | yi- || colspan="2" | -Ø-
|-
! Third indefinite (3)
| colspan="2" | kʼi- || colspan="2" | -Ø-
|-
! Third impersonal (areal-situational)
| colspan="2" | -xo- || colspan="2" | -Ø-
|-
! Reflexive
| colspan="2" | – || colspan="2" | ʼa꞉di-
|-
! Reciprocal
| colspan="2" | – || colspan="2" | n- łi
|}

The subject prefixes occur in two different positions. The first and second subject prefixes (-wh- (or allomorph -e꞉ ), -di-, -ni-, -oh-) occur in position 2, directly before the classifier (voice/valency) prefixes. The animate, obviative, indefinite and "areal-situational" subject prefixes (chʼi-, yi-, kʼi- and xo-) are known as "deictic subject pronouns" and occur in position 8.

The direct object prefixes occur in position 7.

The Hupa free personal subject pronouns are as follows:

Golla (2001:865-6) notes that the 3rd person free pronouns are very rarely used, with demonstrative pronouns being used in their place.

Demonstrative pronouns

 -hay(i)  <  hay-i  'the one (who)'
 -hay-de꞉  <  hay-de꞉-i  'the one here' (de꞉ 'here')
 -hay-de꞉d  <  hay-de꞉-d-i  'this one here' (de꞉-di 'this here')
 -hay-yo꞉w  <  hay-yo꞉w-i  'the one there (close)' (yo꞉wi 'there')
 -hay-ye꞉w  <  hay-ye꞉w-i''  'the one in the distance' (ye꞉wi 'yonder')

References

Bibliography

External links 
 Danny Ammon's Hupa Language Page
 Hupa language overview at the Survey of California and Other Indian Languages
 Hupa Language Dictionary and Texts
 Hupa basic lexicon at the Global Lexicostatistical Database
 OLAC resources in and about the Hupa language

Hupa
Indigenous languages of California
Pacific Coast Athabaskan languages
Endangered Dené–Yeniseian languages